Bnei Netzarim (lit. Sons of Netzarim) is a moshav in the southern Hevel Shalom area in Israel.

History
Bnei Netzarim was founded by settlers from Israeli settlements in Gaza removed during Israel's 2005 disengagement plan, primarily Netzarim. Some of Netzarim's residents were settled in Yevul following the disengagement and decided to found a new village in the same region.

The first residents started home construction in 2008, and the moshav was officially founded and recognized in 2010.

References

External links
Bnei Netzarim at the Eshkol Regional Council website.

Eshkol Regional Council
Moshavim
Populated places established in 2010
Gaza envelope
Populated places in Southern District (Israel)
2010 establishments in Israel